Yugeesha Dishan (born 11 November 1999) is a Sri Lankan cricketer. He made his List A debut on 30 March 2021, for Nondescripts Cricket Club in the 2020–21 Major Clubs Limited Over Tournament. He made his Twenty20 debut on 23 May 2022, for Nondescripts Cricket Club in the Major Clubs T20 Tournament.

References

External links
 

1999 births
Living people
Sri Lankan cricketers
Nondescripts Cricket Club cricketers
Place of birth missing (living people)